Jarrod Freeman (born 15 July 2000) is an Australian cricketer. He made his first-class debut for Tasmania in the 2017–18 Sheffield Shield season on 24 February 2018. Prior to his first-class debut, he was part of Australia's squad for the 2018 Under-19 Cricket World Cup. In 2019, Freeman was added to the Hobart Hurricanes squad to replace Johan Botha, who retired mid-season. He made his Twenty20 debut for the Hobart Hurricanes in the 2018–19 Big Bash League season on 29 January 2019. He made his List A debut for Tasmania, on 1 October 2019, in the 2019–20 Marsh One-Day Cup.

References

External links
 

2000 births
Living people
Australian cricketers
Place of birth missing (living people)
Hobart Hurricanes cricketers
Tasmania cricketers